La guerre du pétrole n'aura pas lieu is a 1975 Moroccan drama film directed by Souheil Ben-Barka. It was entered into the 9th Moscow International Film Festival.

Plot
The film takes place in a fictive Arab country that could be Morocco. In the midst of social turmoil happening in oil refinery plants, an American company uses corruption to get into the local oil business, leading to a peak in revolts. A minister who was trying to denounce the ongoing corruption and the subsequent impoverishment of the country fails to control the revolts and ends up in jail.

Description 
La guerre du pétrole n'aura pas lieu is the second movie of Souheil Ben-Barka. It was really in French theaters on 27 August 1975. Following pressuring threats from Saudi Arabia and Iran, the film was banned.

Cast
 Claude Giraud as Toumer
 Philippe Léotard as Padovani
 Sacha Pitoëff as Essaan
 Assan Ganouni as Hendas
 George Ardisson as Trudot (as Giorgio Ardisson)
 Claudio Gora as Stockell
 David Markham as Thomson
 Henryk Wodzinski as Kreis

References

External links
 

1975 films
1975 drama films
1970s French-language films
Moroccan drama films